John Colianni (born 1966) is an American jazz pianist.

Early life
The son of Patricia Colaianni and journalist James F. Colaianni, John Colianni was born in Paterson, New Jersey on January 7, 1966 and grew up in Maryland. Duke Ellington performed a concert in 1974 at Georgetown University. Colianni was mesmerized by Ellington's piano work, orchestrations, and stage presence. Weekly lessons began at the age of 14.

Career

Colianni played in jazz clubs in Washington D.C., and appeared as a teen with a traveling group of young musicians known as Jazz Stars of the Future. This group performed under the direction of Keter Betts. During his last year of high school, Colianni moved to New Jersey with his family.

He became a pianist in Lionel Hampton's big band for three years. His debut album was released by Concord Records. In 1987, he came in third in the 1987 Thelonious Monk Institute of Jazz International Piano Competition in 

From 1987–1990 he played with film director and clarinetist Woody Allen's Ragtime and Funeral Orchestra. He recorded with Mel Tormé and toured with him in the early 1990s. From 2003–2009 he was a trio led by guitarist Les Paul. From 2010–2013 he toured and recorded with the trio of Larry Coryell. In 2004 he worked with vocalist Anita O'Day. He has recorded with Joe Wilder, Connie Kay, Emily Remler, Mel Lewis, and Lew Tabackin.

Discography

As leader
 John Colianni (Concord Jazz, 1986)
 Blues-o-Matic (Concord Jazz, 1989)
 At Maybeck (Concord Jazz, 1995)
 Colianni & Company (1998)
 Swings (Amosaya, 1999)
 Johnny Chops (Patuxent, 2008)
 On Target (Patuxent, 2011)
 After Hours (Patuxent, 2015)
 I Never Knew (Patuxent, 2018)
 Ahead of the Crowd (Patuxent, 2021)

As sideman
With Mel Torme
 Christmas Songs (Telarc, 1992)
 Nothing Without You (Concord Jazz, 1992)
 Sing, Sing, Sing (Concord Jazz, 1993)
 The Great American Songbook: Live at Michael's Pub (Telarc, 1993)
 A Tribute to Bing Crosby (Concord Jazz, 1994)

With others
 Muriel Anderson, Wildcat (Heartstrings Attached, 2005)
 Larry Coryell, Montgomery (Patuxent, 2011)
 Lionel Hampton, Made in Japan (Timeless, 1983)
 Lionel Hampton, Mostly Ballads (Musicmasters, 1990)

References

1963 births
21st-century American male musicians
21st-century American pianists
American jazz pianists
American male pianists
American male jazz musicians
Living people
Musicians from Paterson, New Jersey